Go Royal Family (Reigned from 37 BC to 668 AD) was the dynasty that founded and ruled over the ancient Korean kingdom of Goguryeo. Its founder, Jumong, broke away from another ancient Korean kingdom called Dongbuyeo to start his own kingdom. The Taewangs were all members of the Go Royal Family.

Ancestry of Jumong 
Jumong was the 4th generation descendant of Hae Mosu, as the grandson of Hae Mosu's second son, King Go Jin, the ruler of Gori. This explains why Jumong was able to rise to the throne of Bukbuyeo.

The Founding 
The Go Royal Family (Hangul: 고씨 왕족), The Han Royal Family (Hangul: 한씨왕족) was founded and descended from one common ancestor, who was Jumong, also the first ruler of Goguryeo. Jumong was the son of Go Mosu and Lady Yuhwa. Lady Yuhwa was the daughter of Habaek, the god of the Amnok River or, according to an alternative interpretation, the sun god Haebak. Go Mosu was a descendant of Haemosu, the founder of Bukbuyeo, or North Buyeo, and was also said to have been a direct descendant or successor to the Emperors of Ancient Joseon (also known as Gojoseon). As a descendant of Haemosu, Jumong was driven by the goal of reuniting all of Gojoseon's ancient territory into one whole empire and one whole nation. With this goal in mind, he set off from Dongbuyeo and began building the foundations for his kingdom. After three years, he had already conquered several of the neighboring kingdoms and was ready to go into the final phase of constructing his kingdom. He completed this phase by holding hands with Jolbon and bringing it under his control. In 37 BC, Jumong finally established his kingdom and named it 'Goguryeo' (Hangul: 고구려). He also changed his last name from 'Hae' to 'Go,' which means 'high.' Goguryeo progressed and continued to grow stronger under Go Jumong's reign of 19 years. His first wife and their son, Yuri, soon to be Emperor King Yuri, fled from Dongbuyeo and came to Goguryeo during the last year of Jumong's reign. Jumong proclaimed Yuri his successor and Crown Prince (Hangul: 태자) before dying five months later.

Complete Transition of the family name 
King Yuri rose to the throne in 19 BC and ruled until his death in 18 AD. During his reign, the royal family had absolute power and all power was in the hands of the reigning emperor. Under Yuri, the kingdom was able to grow powerful enough to fight the Han Dynasty. After King Yuri, Daemusin, Mobon, and Minjung, the young prince Gung took the surname "Go" (Hanja: 高) for the first time in 3 generations. From King Taejo to King Bojang, the rulers of Goguryeo kept their ancestor's surname "Go" and "Han".

According to the Samguk Sagi, the Goguryeo royal family claimed descent from the mythical god Gao Yang, who was the grandson of the Yellow Emperor of Chinese mythology, and thus took the surname of "Go" (高); however, this legend was discredited in the commentaries by Kim Busik, the compiler of the Samguk Sagi, who concluded that both Baekje and Goguryeo originated from Buyeo.

Height of Imperial power 
Goguryeo's height of power came in the reign of Taewang Gwanggaeto the Great of Goguryeo, who created and strengthened Goguryeo's cavalry and naval units to pacify the south and the north. Gwanggaeto the Great attacked and conquered Buyeo, Biryu-guk, the Later Yan, Malgal, and the Ainu tribes. Goguryeo's height of power finally came, but the bringer of glory died at the young age of 39.

Decline of Imperial power 
King Munjamyeong continued to expand Goguryeo's territories after receiving the full surrender of the ancient Korean state of Buyeo in 494. After the reign of King Munjamyeong, his son Heung-An became King Anjang. King Anjang continued to attack the southern kingdoms and weaken their power, further establishing the empire's power over both the Korean peninsula and Manchuria. After King Anjang, his son became King Anwon.

Fall of Goguryeo 
Goguryeo's 27th ruler, King Yeongryu, submitted to the newly-risen Tang Dynasty, despite the overwhelming victories that Goguryeo had achieved over the Sui. King Yeongryu was assassinated by Yeon Gaesomun (연개소문), who was Dae Magniji (대막리지/Grand Prime Minister) of Goguryeo until 666 CE. King Bojang, the nephew of King Yeongryu, rose to the throne and ruled until 668 CE, when Goguryeo was destroyed.

See also 
 History of Korea
 Three Kingdoms of Korea
 Taewang

References 

G